Atlantic Salvor is a US-flagged ocean-going tugboat owned and operated by Donjon Marine of Hillside, New Jersey.  Sailing under her original name  Mister Darby until 1998, the boat was built by Halter Marine Inc. and launched on 1 February 1977.  She was involved in the salvage operation following the wreck of New Carissa.

Construction
Then named Mister Darby, the boat's construction was completed and she was delivered to Jackson Marine Corporation on 9 February 1997. The boat has a total of 21 tanks: 12 for fuel oil, 5 for ballast water, 5 for lubricating oil, 7 apiece for fresh- and waste-water, a hydraulic oil tank, a slop tank, and an anchor chain locker. The tug can carry up to 6 cubic meters of fuel, has a gross tonnage of 852 GT and a net tonnage of 205 NT.

The boat's propulsion is powered by two Alco Engine Inc. Model 29 F 18 MS&MR engines with a maximum continuous power rating of  apiece. Each engine powers a single cast steel propeller. Electrical power is generated by two  auxiliary generators.

In 1998, the tugboat was purchased by Donjon and renamed Atlantic Salvor.

History

Salvage of the New Carissa

MV New Carissa was a Japanese-owned bulk carrier flying the Panamanian flag of convenience that ran aground on a beach near Coos Bay, Oregon, United States, during a storm in February 1999, and subsequently broke apart. The ship's insurers declared the vessel to be a total loss. As a result, New Carissa was no longer a salvageable vessel; instead, she had effectively become a shipwreck.

Attempts using the "Salvage Chief" and the "Atlantic Salvor" pulling together to refloat and tow the stern section were unsuccessful.

Tow of the ex-USS John F. Kennedy
Atlantic Salvor was hired by the United States Navy to tow the decommissioned ex-John F. Kennedy from Norfolk to Philadelphia in March 2008.

Notes

References

External links 
 Atlantic Salvor specifications page at Donjon Marine
 Tug 44 article on Atlantic Salvor (photos)
 Numerous photos

Tugboats of the United States
1977 ships